David Adams and Marius Barnard were the defending champions but they competed with different partners that year, Adams with Olivier Delaître and Barnard with Piet Norval.

Barnard and Norval lost in the first round to Hendrik Jan Davids and Menno Oosting.

Adams and Delaître lost in the quarterfinals to Libor Pimek and Byron Talbot.

Jacco Eltingh and Paul Haarhuis won in the final 7–6, 6–4 against Pimek and Talbot.

Seeds
Champion seeds are indicated in bold text while text in italics indicates the round in which those seeds were eliminated.

  Jacco Eltingh /  Paul Haarhuis (champions)
  Jan Siemerink /  Daniel Vacek (first round)
  Libor Pimek /  Byron Talbot (final)
  Martin Damm /  Andrei Olhovskiy (semifinals)

Draw

References
 1997 ABN AMRO World Tennis Tournament Doubles Draw

1997 ABN AMRO World Tennis Tournament
1997 ATP Tour